Epermenia afghanistanella is a moth in the family Epermeniidae. It was described by Reinhard Gaedike in 1971. It is found in Afghanistan.

References

Epermeniidae
Moths described in 1971
Insects of Afghanistan
Moths of Asia